Canadian Pacific Building may refer to:

 Canadian Pacific Building (London)
 Canadian Pacific Building (New York City)
 Canadian Pacific Building (Toronto), completed in 1913

See also
Canadian Pacific (disambiguation)